Nand Kishore Acharya (born 31 August 1945) is an Indian playwright, poet, and critic who was born in Bikaner, Rajasthan. He is a professor emeritus at the International Institute of Information Technology, Hyderabad, where he taught Political Economy and Human Rights.

Awards

Sahitya Academy Award 2019.
Rajasthan Sahitya Akademi's highest honour Mira Award.

Bibliography

Poetry
 Jal Hai Jhan (1980)
 Wah Ek Samudra Tha (1982)
 Shabda Bhule Hue (1987)
 Aati Hai Jaise Mrityu (1990)
 Kavita Mein Nahin Hai Jo (1995)
 Anya Hote Hue (2008)

Plays
 Dehaantar (including Kimidam Yaksham 1987)
 Paagalghar (including Joote 1988)
 Gulam Badshah (including Hastinapur 1992)
 Kisi aur ka sapna

Criticisms
 Ajneya Ki Kaavya Titirsha (1970)
 Rachna Ka Sacch (1986)
 Sarjak Ka Man (1987)
 Anubhava Ka Bhaval (1994)
 Sahitya Ka Svabhava (2001)
 Sarjak Ka Man

Others
 Sanskriti Ka Vyakarana (1988)
 Aadhunik Vichar Aur Shiksha (1989)
 Parampara Aur Parivartan (1991)
 Sabhyata Ka Vikalpa
 The Cultural Polity of the Hindus
 Polity in Shukranitisaar

Translation
 Sunate Hue Baarish (1983) (Riokaan)
 Nav Manavaad (1998) (M.N. Roy)
 Vignana Aur Darshan (1999) (M.N. Roy)

References

Indian male poets
People from Bikaner
Rajasthani people
Living people
1945 births
Poets from Rajasthan
20th-century Indian poets
20th-century Indian male writers
Recipients of the Sahitya Akademi Award in Hindi